Torreano is a comune (municipality) in the Province of Udine in the Italian region Friuli-Venezia Giulia, located about  northwest of Trieste and about  northeast of Udine, on the border with Slovenia. According to the census 1971 24,5% of the population are Slovenes.

Torreano borders the following municipalities: Kobarid (Slovenia), Cividale del Friuli, Faedis, Moimacco, Pulfero, San Pietro al Natisone.

Demographic evolution

See also 
Venetian Slovenia
Friuli
Slovene Lands

References

External links
 www.torreano.net/

Cities and towns in Friuli-Venezia Giulia